Warszawa  is a village in the administrative district of Gmina Wronki, within Szamotuły County, Greater Poland Voivodeship, in west-central Poland.

The village has a population of 28.

References

Warszawa